Black Cobra (Cobra nero in Italy) is an Italian Blaxploitation series of four action films. All of its films are centered on Robert 'Bob' Malone (Fred Williamson), a maverick police detective who deals out his own brand of justice.

Overview
The following are plot summaries for the entire Black Cobra series.

Black Cobra
The film was released in 1987, directed by Stelvio Massi.  When a beautiful photographer (Eva Grimaldi) witnesses a murder committed by the leader (Bruno Bilotta) of a vicious motorcycle gang, it's up to Malone to protect her. The gang throws everything they've got at Malone to eliminate the eyewitness, but Malone is tough-as-nails.

The plot and title of the film are derived from the 1986 film Cobra starring Sylvester Stallone.

Black Cobra 2
The film was released in 1989, directed by Edoardo Margheriti. Malone is back and this time he finds himself in the Philippines due to a law-enforcement exchange program that his boss ordered. While picking up his luggage at the airport Malone is pickpocketed. An Interpol agent named Lt. Kevin McCall (Nicholas Hammond) tracks down the thief with Malone, only to find the thief dead. After this Malone and McCall uncover clues leading to a terrorist who will kill anyone in his way.

Black Cobra 3: Manila Connection
The film was released in 1990, directed by Edoardo Margheriti. Malone again shows his incredible skills in thwarting a grocery store hold-up.  Malone is then called in by Interpol to track down some pawns who stole a vital arms shipment in the Philippines. Once the thieves are tracked down, Malone mounts his assault on the criminals' jungle fortress.

Black Cobra 4 (Detective Malone)
The film was released in 1991, directed by Umberto Lenzi. A gang of Arab terrorists kidnaps a scientific engineer in order to create a device that will make international terrorism more powerful.  This film never got an American release.

References

External links 

Film series introduced in 1987
1980s multilingual films
Italian multilingual films
American multilingual films
Italian action films
Action film series
1980s Italian-language films
English-language Italian films
Films directed by Stelvio Massi
Films directed by Umberto Lenzi
Films set in the Philippines
Films set in the United States
Films shot in Italy
Films shot in the Philippines
1980s action films
Police detective films
Blaxploitation films
1980s exploitation films
Tetralogies
1980s Italian films